Sir John William Kay PC Kt (13 September 1943 – 2 July 2004) was a Lord Justice of Appeal, a member of the Court of Appeal of England and Wales from 2000 until his death.

Career
After being called to the bar in 1968 following a brief stint as a schoolteacher, he became a King's Counsel in 1984 and was named to the High Court of Justice of England and Wales in 1992.

On the Court of Appeal he upheld the conviction of mass murderer Jeremy Bamber in 2002, perhaps his most celebrated case. He subsequently overturned the murder conviction of Sally Clark, accused of killing her two young sons, and dismissed the posthumous appeal in the name of the executed Ruth Ellis on largely technical grounds.

Personal life
Growing up near Liverpool, he was educated at Denstone College and subsequently studied mathematics at Christ's College, Cambridge before switching to law. A keen rugby enthusiast he played for Waterloo Rugby Club in his youth and later became club president between 1995 to 1997. He married Ida Kay in 1966, whem he had two daughters and a son. Ben, who was part of the victorious 2003 Rugby World Cup squad. His daughter Amanda was appointed to the High Court in 2017.

Kay passed away on the 2nd of July 2004 in London, following a heart attack. He was cremated and buried alongside his wife Jennifer, at Sefton Parish Churchyard in Merseyside.

References

1943 births
2004 deaths
Alumni of Christ's College, Cambridge
English barristers
20th-century English judges
English King's Counsel
Queen's Bench Division judges
Knights Bachelor
Lords Justices of Appeal
Members of the Privy Council of the United Kingdom
People educated at Denstone College
People from Crosby, Merseyside
20th-century King's Counsel
Waterloo R.F.C. players
Lawyers from Liverpool
Place of death missing
Members of Gray's Inn
21st-century English judges